Rio Oso (Spanish: Río Oso, meaning "Bear River") is a census-designated place (CDP) in Sutter County, California. The ZIP Code is 95674. The community is inside area code 530. The 2010 United States census reported Rio Oso's population was 356.

Geography
According to the United States Census Bureau, the CDP covers an area of 6.5 square miles (16.9 km), all of it land.

Demographics
The 2010 United States Census reported that Rio Oso had a population of 356. The racial makeup of Rio Oso was 274 (77.0%) White, 5 (1.4%) African American, 7 (2.0%) Native American, 26 (7.3%) Asian, 1 (0.3%) Pacific Islander, 32 (9.0%) from other races, and 11 (3.1%) from two or more races. Hispanic or Latino of any race were 53 persons (14.9%).

The Census reported that 356 people (100% of the population) lived in households, 0 (0%) lived in non-institutionalized group quarters, and 0 (0%) were institutionalized.

There were 124 households, out of which 42 (33.9%) had children under the age of 18 living in them, 82 (66.1%) were opposite-sex married couples living together, 6 (4.8%) had a female householder with no husband present, 6 (4.8%) had a male householder with no wife present.  There were 8 (6.5%) unmarried opposite-sex partnerships, and 0 (0%) same-sex married couples or partnerships. 21 households (16.9%) were made up of individuals, and 8 (6.5%) had someone living alone who was 65 years of age or older. The average household size was 2.87.  There were 94 families (75.8% of all households); the average family size was 3.28.

The population was spread out, with 85 people (23.9%) under the age of 18, 15 people (4.2%) aged 18 to 24, 95 people (26.7%) aged 25 to 44, 106 people (29.8%) aged 45 to 64, and 55 people (15.4%) who were 65 years of age or older.  The median age was 42.2 years. For every 100 females, there were 103.4 males.  For every 100 females age 18 and over, there were 103.8 males.

There were 140 housing units at an average density of 21.4 per square mile (8.3/km), of which 95 (76.6%) were owner-occupied, and 29 (23.4%) were occupied by renters. The homeowner vacancy rate was 2.0%; the rental vacancy rate was 6.5%.  276 people (77.5% of the population) lived in owner-occupied housing units and 80 people (22.5%) lived in rental housing units.

Politics
In the state legislature, Rio Oso is located in the 4th Senate District, represented by Republican Doug LaMalfa, and in the 2nd Assembly District, represented by Republican Jim Nielsen.

Notable person
Wally Herger, Congressman and Rio Oso resident.

References

Census-designated places in Sutter County, California
Census-designated places in California